Baseball competitions at the 1979 Pan American Games in San Juan, Puerto Rico were held on July 2nd–12th. The venues for the competition were the Juan Ramón Loubriel Stadium, the Guaynabo Municipal Stadium and the Parque Yldefonso Solá Morales.

Cuba entered the competition as the two-time defending champions, having won the gold medal in 1971 and 1975. They successfully defended their title, with the Dominican Republic finishing second.

Medalists

Results
The tournament consisted of a single round-robin group where all nine teams played each other once. Medals were awarded to the top three teams in the group at the end of the tournament.

References

 

1979 Pan American Games
1979
Pan American Games
1979 Pan American Games